Every Good Boy Deserves Favour may refer to:

 EGBDF, mnemonic for the musical scale
 Every Good Boy Deserves Favour (play), a 1977 stage play by Tom Stoppard with music by André Previn
 Every Good Boy Deserves Favour (album), a 1971 album by the Moody Blues